Superior Bancorp was a bank holding company for Superior Bank, headquartered in Birmingham, Alabama. It had 73 branches in Alabama and Florida. In April 2011, it suffered from bank failure and its assets were acquired by an affiliate of Cadence Bank.

History
The company was founded in 1997.

In December 1998, the company became a public company via an initial public offering.

On April 15, 2011, Superior Bank suffered from bank failure and its assets were acquired by an affiliate of Cadence Bank in a transaction facilitated by the Federal Deposit Insurance Corporation (FDIC).

The bank failure cost the FDIC more than $530 million. In 2014, the FDIC sued former executives of the Florida division of the bank, claiming they took “unreasonable financial risks” in making unsafe loans.

References

Bank failures in the United States
Banks established in 1997
Banks disestablished in 2011
Defunct banks of the United States
1997 establishments in Alabama
1998 initial public offerings